Benjamin Russell Hanby (July 22, 1833 – March 16, 1867), also given as Benjamin Russel Hanby, was an American composer, educator, pastor, and abolitionist who wrote approximately 80 songs. The most famous are "Darling Nelly Gray" and the Christmas songs "Up on the House Top" and "Who Is He In Yonder Stall?".

Hanby was born in Rushville, Ohio.  He moved to Westerville, Ohio in 1849, at the age of sixteen, to enroll at Otterbein University. He was involved in the Underground Railroad with his father, Bishop William Hanby.

Hanby composed the popular anti-slavery ballad Darling Nelly Gray in 1856 in what is now a national historical site, the Hanby House, located at the corner of Grove and Main Streets (in the 1830s, when Hanby was still a child his family moved to 160 West Main Street) in Westerville, adjacent to the campus of Otterbein University. The song was based on the Hanby family’s encounter with Joseph Selby, a runaway slave from Kentucky who died at the Hanby home in Rushville after relating the moving story of his escape to freedom and having to leave behind his lost love.  Hanby wrote several other notable anti-slavery songs during this period including Ole Shady, The Song of the Contraband and Little Tillie's Grave.

After graduation in 1858, Hanby briefly taught school and then became a minister in the Church of the United Brethren in Christ. In 1860, he became principal of Seven Mile Academy in Seven Mile, Ohio.

In 1864, Hanby was minister of a church in New Paris, Ohio, but by Christmas 1864, he was no longer working as a pastor, but operating a singing school in New Paris. He composed "Up On The Housetop" as a Christmas sing-along. It was originally titled Santa Claus. The following year, Chicago publisher George Frederick Root published "Up On The Housetop" and brought Hanby to Chicago to pursue other publishing ventures.

At age 33, Hanby died from tuberculosis in Chicago on March 16, 1867. He is buried in Otterbein Cemetery in Westerville.

Today the Hanby House is a museum managed by the Westerville Historical Society.

References

External links 
Benjamin Hanby at britannica.com
Benjamin Hanby at ohiohistorycentral.org
Hanby House information from the General Commission on Archives and History

 

Hanby House Museum 

American male composers
Otterbein University alumni
1833 births
1867 deaths
People from Fairfield County, Ohio
19th-century deaths from tuberculosis
Musicians from Dayton, Ohio
People from Westerville, Ohio
American United Brethren in Christ
American abolitionists
Tuberculosis deaths in Illinois
Burials in Ohio
Ministers of the Evangelical United Brethren Church
19th-century American composers
People from New Paris, Ohio
19th-century American male musicians
American school principals
Christian abolitionists